Si può fare is an album by the Italian singer-songwriter Angelo Branduardi. It was released in 1992 by EMI Italiana.

Track listing
"Si può fare"
"Il viaggiatore"
"Noi, come fiumi"
"Casanova"
"Forte"
"Indiani"
"Cambia il vento, cambia il tempo"
"L'ombra"
"Devi trattarla bene"
"Prima di ripartire"

1992 albums
Angelo Branduardi albums
Polydor Records albums